Pseudiberus is a genus of air-breathing land snails, terrestrial pulmonate gastropod mollusks in the family Bradybaenidae.

Taxonomy
Two subgenera Pseudiberus and Platypetasus were synonymized in the study published in 2006 by Min Wu and Gang Qi, because their genital characters and their distribution range largely overlap.

Distribution
These terrestrial snails inhabit Eastern Asia.

Species list
Species in the genus Pseudiberus: 
 Pseudiberus anderssoni (Odhner, 1925)
 Pseudiberus anderssoni depressa (Yen, 1935)
 Pseudiberus anisopleurus Ancey, 1897
 Pseudiberus castanopsis (Möllendorff, 1899)
 Pseudiberus causius (Möllendorff, 1899)
 Pseudiberus chentingensis Yen, 1935 - synonym: Pseudiberus cixianensis Chen & Zhang, 2000
 Pseudiberus chentingensis latispira Yen, 1935
 Pseudiberus chitralensis (Odhner, 1963)
 Pseudiberus encaustochilus (Möllendorff, 1899)
 Pseudiberus futtereri (Andreae, 1903)
 Pseudiberus innominatus (Heude, 1885)
 Pseudiberus innominatus aquilus (H. Adams, 1870)
 Pseudiberus innominatus duplicatus (Möllendorff, 1899)
 Pseudiberus lancasteri (Gude, 1919)
 Pseudiberus mariellus (H. Adams, 1870)
 Pseudiberus mariellus submariellus (Pilsbry, 1893)
 Pseudiberus mataianensis (Nevill, 1878)
 Pseudiberus obrutschewi (Sturany, 1901)
 Pseudiberus plectotropis (Martens, 1864)
 Pseudiberus strophostomus (Möllendorff, 1899)
 Pseudiberus tectumsinense (Martens, 1873) - type species of the genus Pseudiberus
 Pseudiberus trochomorphus (Möllendorff, 1899) 
 Pseudiberus trochomorphus microtrochus (Möllendorff, 1887)
 Pseudiberus trochomorphus wentschuanensis (Blume, 1925)
 Pseudiberus zenonis (Gredler, 1882)

Ecology
These snails live under old stones and in forests. They eat plants.

References

External links

 

Bradybaenidae